Donald L. Ray (July 8, 1921 – November 23, 1998) was a National Basketball Association (NBA) player. As a senior at Western Kentucky University, Ray was selected to the All-American second team by the Helms Foundation. Ray was drafted with the eleventh overall pick in the 1948 BAA Draft by the Philadelphia Warriors. He made his NBA debut in the 1949-50 NBA season for the Tri-Cities Blackhawks. In sixty-one games for the Blackhawks, Ray averaged 6.0 points and 1.0 assist per game.

Career statistics

NBA
Source

Regular season

Playoffs

References

1921 births
1998 deaths
All-American college men's basketball players
American men's basketball players
Basketball players from Tennessee
Centers (basketball)
People from Mount Juliet, Tennessee
Philadelphia Warriors draft picks
Power forwards (basketball)
Tri-Cities Blackhawks players
Western Kentucky Hilltoppers basketball players